The 2015–16 AIA Premier T20 Tournament was a Twenty20 cricket tournament that was held in Sri Lanka. It was played between domestic teams in Sri Lanka, with the tournament starting on 22 December 2015 and concluding on 24 January 2016. 

Following the conclusion of the group stage, Nondescripts Cricket Club, Tamil Union Cricket and Athletic Club, Sri Lanka Army Sports Club and Sinhalese Sports Club progressed to the semi-finals. Sri Lanka Army won the tournament, after they beat Tamil Union Cricket and Athletic Club by five wickets in the final.

Fixtures

Group stage

Group A

Group B

Knockout stage

Semifinals

Final

References

External links
 Series home at ESPN Cricinfo

SLC Twenty20 Tournament
SLC Twenty20 Tournament